German musician Bausa has released two studio albums, one mixtape, one extended play (EP) and twenty-three singles.

Albums

Studio albums

Mixtapes

Extended plays

Singles

As lead artist

As featured artist

Soundtrack appearances

Other charted songs

Guest appearances

Music videos

References

Discographies of German artists
Hip hop discographies